The Milde is a river in the German state of Saxony-Anhalt, source river of the Biese. The Milde flows into the Biese near Meßdorf.

See also
List of rivers of Saxony-Anhalt

References

Rivers of Saxony-Anhalt
Rivers of Germany